Mythicism, 
mythopoeia
superstition
the Christ myth theory

See also
Mysticism
Euhemerism